Sir James Frederick Palmer (7 June 1803 – 23 April 1871) was a medical practitioner, Victorian pioneer, first President of the Victorian Legislative Council and Mayor of Melbourne.

Early life
Palmer was born in Great Torrington, Devonshire, England, the fourth son of the Rev. John Palmer (a nephew of Sir Joshua Reynolds), and his wife Jane, a daughter of William Johnson. He was trained in medicine, practised in London, and was surgeon at St Thomas's hospital. In 1824 he became a house surgeon at St George's Hospital (M.A.C.S., 1826). In 1835-37 he edited a four-volume edition of the Works of John Hunter, the anatomist. He also supplied the glossary to A Dialogue in the Devonshire Dialect (In Three Parts), published in 1837, an abbreviated version of the original manuscript published as A Devonshire Dialogue in Four Parts written by his grandmother in the mid-eighteenth century.

On 21 November 1831 Palmer married Isabella, third daughter of Dr John Gunning, C.B., who was inspector-general of hospitals at the time. After failing to secure two surgical appointments, Palmer migrated to Melbourne, arriving at the end of September 1840, and in addition to practising his profession, was proprietor of a cordial manufactory and later, a wine merchant.

Politics
Palmer was an early member of the Melbourne City Council and was elected Mayor of Melbourne in 1845. A mayor he laid the foundation-stone of the first Melbourne hospital building on 20 March 1846. In September 1848 Palmer was elected one of five members for Port Phillip District for the New South Wales Legislative Council, but resigned in June 1849. When Victoria became a separate colony in 1851, Palmer was elected a member of the Victorian Legislative Council for Normanby, Dundas and Follett and its speaker. When responsible government was granted Palmer became a candidate for the Council and was elected in 1856 for the Western Province. He was the Council's first President and continued in that position until September 1870, when he did not seek re-election to the Council on account of his failing health. He was knighted in 1857.

Palmer was a good President of the council, took much interest in the Melbourne hospital, of which he was president for 26 years, and was also greatly interested in education. Palmer was president of the national board of education and subsequently of the board of education. Charles La Trobe described him as 'a gentleman by birth, education and profession. Sometimes he pulled against, more often for, but I always respected him as honest'.

Palmer died at Burwood, his estate in Hawthorn, Melbourne, on 23 April 1871.

References

External links
Sir James Frederick Palmer at Victorian Parliament
A dialogue in the Devonshire dialect Glossary by J. F. Palmer
"James Frederick Palmer" at The Peerage

 

1803 births
1871 deaths
Victoria (Australia) state politicians
English emigrants to colonial Australia
Mayors and Lord Mayors of Melbourne
Members of the New South Wales Legislative Council
Members of the Victorian Legislative Council
Presidents of the Victorian Legislative Council
19th-century Australian politicians
People from Hawthorn, Victoria